Lean Bergmann (born 4 October 1998) is a German professional ice hockey forward who is currently playing with Adler Mannheim in the Deutsche Eishockey Liga (DEL). He has previously played with the San Jose Sharks in the National Hockey League (NHL). He also plays internationally for the German national team.

Playing career

Bergmann played at the under-16 level in his native Germany with Mannheimer ERC. As a 15-year-old, Bergmann opted to further his development by moving to Sweden and playing in the J18 and J20 Elit junior levels with Frölunda HC and Almtuna IS.

During the 2015–16 season, Bergmann left Almtuna and Sweden on 4 January 2016 to pursue his North American ambition by signing for the remainder of the season with the Sioux Falls Stampede of the United States Hockey League (USHL).

Following two and half seasons in the USHL with the Stampede and the Green Bay Gamblers, Bergmann was not selected in his eligible NHL Entry Draft years. He returned to Germany to embark on his professional career, agreeing to a one-year contract with his hometown club, the Iserlohn Roosters of the top-tiered Deutsche Eishockey Liga (DEL) on 26 July 2018.

In his rookie professional season in 2018–19, Bergmann quickly adapted to show his scoring abilities with the Roosters, finishing third among teammates with 20 goals in 50 regular season games. As the youngest DEL player to reach the 20-goal plateau, Bergman was signed in the midst of the campaign to a lucrative one-year contract with contending club Adler Mannheim for the 2019–20 season on 17 January 2019.

In the off-season, before he could commence his contract with Championship-winning Adler Mannheim, Bergmann gained the interest of NHL teams as an undrafted prospect. On 28 May 2019, he was signed by the San Jose Sharks to a three-year entry-level contract. Bergmann made his NHL debut with the Sharks on 2 October 2019 against the Vegas Golden Knights.

Following his second season within the Sharks organization, having appeared in just 13 games with San Jose, Bergmann was placed on unconditional waivers in order to mutually terminate the remaining year of his contract with the Sharks on 23 July 2021. On 26 July 2021, Bergmann as a free agent returned to the German DEL, re-joining Adler Mannheim on a two-year contract.

International play
Bergmann made his senior international debut, representing Germany at the 2019 IIHF World Championship in Slovakia. He finished the tournament scoreless in 5 appearances, as Germany placed 6th.

Career statistics

Regular season and playoffs

International

References

External links

1998 births
Living people
Adler Mannheim players
Expatriate ice hockey players in the United States
German expatriate ice hockey people
German expatriate sportspeople in Sweden
German expatriate sportspeople in the United States
German ice hockey forwards
Green Bay Gamblers players
Iserlohn Roosters players
People from Hemer
Sportspeople from Arnsberg (region)
San Jose Barracuda players
San Jose Sharks players
Sioux Falls Stampede players
Undrafted National Hockey League players
Ice hockey players at the 2022 Winter Olympics
Olympic ice hockey players of Germany